Balša Hercegović (1455) was the titular "Duke of St. Sava" (dux sancti Save), as son of Vladislav Hercegović, the Duke of Saint Sava, sprung from the marriage to Byzantine princess Anna Kantakouzene. Historian D. Lovrenović noted that it was possible that he was Jelena Nelipić's son.  Some time after 1455, Vladislav sent Anna and Balša and his niece Mara to live in the Republic of Ragusa. Balša's brother was Petar.  His father was given the estate of Kalnik near Križevci, Croatia in 1469 by Matthias Corvinus, where Balša seems to have retired.

References

15th-century births
15th-century deaths
Ragusan nobility
Hercegović noble family